Crimson Records was an American reissue independent record label founded by Jerry Greene in the early 1960s, and was a sister label of Lost Nite Records.  Disc jockey Jerry Blavat was a co-owner of the label until the late 1960s.  The label was known for releasing rare and hard-to-find doo-wop and R&B records.  During its existence, Crimson released two LPs and approximately 18 singles.  The most popular single released by the label was "Expressway to Your Heart" by The Soul Survivors.

Discography

Albums
 LP-501 Jerry Blavat Presents Guess What? by Various Artists (issued December 1966)
 LP-502 When The Whistle Blows Anything Goes by The Soul Survivors (issued November 1967)

Singles
 1010 "Expressway to Your Heart" by The Soul Survivors
 1012 "Explosion (In My Soul)" by The Soul Survivors b/w "Dathon's Theme"
 1016 "Impossible Mission (Mission Impossible)" by The Soul Survivors
 1008 "I Need Your Love" b/w "Not My Baby"  by The Masters (with John Oates)

See also
 Lost Nite Records
 List of record labels

References

Companies based in Philadelphia
American independent record labels
Defunct record labels of the United States
Reissue record labels
Defunct companies based in Pennsylvania